Andrew John Goodwin (born 3 September 1982) is a former English cricketer.  Goodwin was a left-handed opening-batsman who bowled leg break.  He was born at Burton-on-Trent, Staffordshire.

Goodwin represented the Derbyshire Cricket Board in two List A matches against Wiltshire and Cambridgeshire in the 2001 Cheltenham & Gloucester Trophy.  Against Wiltshire, he was dismissed for 38 by James Tomlinson, while against Cambridgeshire he was dismissed for a duck by Ajaz Akhtar.  In that same season, he also appeared for the Derbyshire Cricket Board in three MCCA Knockout Trophy matches.

References

External links
Andrew Goodwin at ESPNcricinfo
Andrew Goodwin at CricketArchive

1982 births
Living people
Sportspeople from Burton upon Trent
English cricketers
Derbyshire Cricket Board cricketers